Eamonn Roderique Walker (born 12 June 1962) is an English actor. On television, he began in the BBC sitcom In Sickness and in Health (1985–1987), the ITV crime dramas The Bill (1988–1989) and Supply & Demand (1998), and the HBO series Oz (1997–2003), for which he won a CableACE Award.

He led the ITV television film Othello (2001) and had a further role in the Fox series Justice (2006–2007). Since 2012, Walker has starred in the NBC drama Chicago Fire and its spinoffs. His films include Young Soul Rebels (1991), Once in the Life (2000), Legacy (2010), and A Lonely Place to Die (2011).

Background
Walker was born in west London to a Grenadian father and a Trinidadian mother, in 1962. Brought up in Islington in north London, Walker lived in Trinidad for six months when he was nine years old. He attended Hungerford School in Islington and began studying social work at the Polytechnic of North London. He trained as a dancer and later joined the Explosive Dance Theatre Company in London. However, an abscess on his calf muscle forced him to give up dancing. He also studied at the New York Film Academy in the United States.

Career

Early career in UK 
Walker made his professional acting debut in 1983 on stage in London playing an East End punk rocker in the musical Labelled with Love, based partly on the music of the pop band Squeeze. His first television appearance came in 1985 when he appeared in an episode on the second series of Dempsey and Makepeace, which aired on ITV on 19 October 1985. His next television appearance came the following year in an episode of the children's anthology series Dramarama, also on ITV. Also that year, he was cast in the role of Winston, a black, gay, council carer and a thorn in Alf Garnett's side, for series 1–3 of In Sickness and in Health on BBC1. In 1987 he appeared in an episode of Bulman on Granada TV and in 1988 an episode of the ninth series of Tales of the Unexpected. In 1988 he won the role of PC Malcolm Haynes in The Bill on ITV, a part he played from 1988–89.

His first film role came in 1991, playing Carlton in Young Soul Rebels about the interaction between different youth cultural movements in late 1970s Britain. He also appeared in an episode of the detective series Bergerac on BBC1. In 1992 he appeared in episodes of Love Hurts and The Old Boy Network. Then in 1993 he appeared in two comedies on BBC, with the role of Colin in three episodes of Birds of a Feather and he also appeared in an episode of One Foot in the Grave. His second film came in 1994 playing Peters in Shopping. He followed this in 1995 with appearances in two more British sitcoms, on the BBC, The Detectives and Goodnight Sweetheart. He also appeared in the drama series The Governor.

1997 to present – Hollywood and U.S. television
He appeared as Jake Brown in the miniseries Supply & Demand in 1997.

The same year he won the major role of Kareem Saïd on the American television drama series Oz on HBO in the United States. The series was set in a fictional maximum-security prison, and the character Walker played was a new inmate who was a devout Muslim. Walker spent time at a mosque in Harlem doing research on the Nation of Islam and American Muslim culture, explaining "As an actor, my portrayal had to be real." He appeared in the first episode on 12 July 1997 and he continued to play the role until the third episode of the final season in 2003. He won the award for Best Actor in a Dramatic Series in the inaugural CableACE Awards for his performance in the first series of Oz in the ceremony held in Los Angeles. Then in 1999 he received a Satellite Awards nomination for Best Actor in a TV Drama Series for his performances in Oz.

In 2000 Walker appeared in two films: the crime drama Once in the Life, acting alongside and being directed by Laurence Fishburne on his directorial debut; and the fantasy mystery Unbreakable, alongside Bruce Willis and Samuel L. Jackson. Walker also appeared in the de facto series finale of Homicide: Life on the Street, Homicide: The Movie. In 2001 he returned to British television starring as John Othello in a modern adaptation of the William Shakespeare play Othello on ITV, opposite Christopher Eccleston. For his role he won the Best male performance in television award at the first ever Black Film Makers (BMF) Film and Television Awards ceremony for the UK's leading black TV and film stars, which was held at the Grosvenor House Hotel in London in September 2002.

In 2003 he starred in the war film Tears of the Sun as Ellis "Zee" Pettigrew alongside Bruce Willis. Walker also appeared in an episode of the Fox Network drama series The Jury. The next year he made another return to British television in an episode of the crime drama Rose and Maloney.

Two more films followed in 2005, the crime thriller Lord of War with Nicolas Cage and the drama adventure film Duma. And from March 2005 he made his debut on Broadway, playing Mark Antony in Julius Caesar at the Belasco Theatre in midtown-Manhattan alongside Denzel Washington as Marcus Brutus.

In 2006, he played Dr Stephen Dakarai in three episodes of the medical drama series ER. He also starred in the Fox Network legal drama Justice, playing the part of Luther Graves.

In May 2007, he became the first black actor to play the role of Othello at either the original Globe Theatre or at the modern reconstruction, Shakespeare's Globe in London.

Then in 2008 he was in the second episode of the BBC drama series Bonekickers, playing Senator Joy, a United States Presidential candidate. He also starred in three films: the action drama Blood and Bone; the biographical music drama Cadillac Records, about the 1950s musical era, in which he plays the influential blues singer, guitarist and harmonica player Howlin' Wolf, which was released on 5 December 2008; and the romantic war drama The Messenger, in which Walker plays Colonel Stuart Dorsett. The first and the latter were released in 2009.

In October 2008 he performed on BBC Radio 4 in the first adaptation of Alice Walker's 1982 epistolary novel The Color Purple in the UK, serialised in ten parts.

Walker appeared on the NBC drama series Kings, which was based on the biblical story of David. He portrayed Reverend Ephram Samuels, an analogue of the biblical prophet Samuel. He also starred in the TV series The Whole Truth, alongside Maura Tierney and Rob Morrow, which premiered on 22 September 2010.

In 2011 Walker appeared on FX series Lights Out as trainer Ed Romeo, former trainer of Lights Leary's last opponent, Death Row Reynolds. Walker appeared in an episode of BBC One's Inspector George Gently, playing the father of a murder victim in 2012, and in two episodes of the BBC/Cinemax series Strike Back. In 2013 he portrayed Frederick Douglass in the BBC series Copper.
In 2020, Walker stars as the lead in Steppenwolf Theatre Company's production of Between Riverside and Crazy by Stephen Adly Guirgis.
In October 2020 Eamon appeared on portrait artist of the year UK

Personal life
Walker lives in the United States with his wife Sandra. They have three children, two of whom, Jahdine and Deke, are twins.

Filmography

Film
 Young Soul Rebels (1991) .... Carlton
 Shopping (1994) .... Peters
 Once in the Life (2000) .... Tony
 Unbreakable (2000) .... Dr. Mathison
 Tears of the Sun (2003) .... Ellis 'Zee' Pettigrew
 Duma (2005) .... Ripkuna
 Lord of War (2005) .... Andre Baptiste Senior
 Cadillac Records (2008) .... Howlin' Wolf
 The Messenger (2009) .... Colonel Stuart Dorsett
 Blood and Bone (2009) .... James
 The Company Men (2010) .... Danny
 Legacy (2010) .... Darnell Gray Jnr
 A Lonely Place to Die (2011) .... Andy

Television

 Dempsey and Makepeace (1985) .... Edwin Shore
 In Sickness and in Health (1985–1987) .... Winston
 Dramarama (1986) .... P.C. Garfield Walcott
 Bulman (1987) .... DC Little Jimmy
 Tales of the Unexpected (1988) .... Bates
 The Bill (1988–1989) .... P.C. Haynes
 Bergerac (1991) .... Conrad
 Love Hurts (1992) .... Young Ghod
 The Old Boy Network (1992) .... Patrick
 Birds of a Feather (1993) .... Colin
 One Foot in the Grave (1993) .... Hugo
 The Detectives (1995) .... D.I. Tyler
 Goodnight Sweetheart (1995) .... Thursfield
 The Governor (1995-1996) .... Snoopy Oswald
 Oz (1997-2003) .... Kareem Said
 Supply & Demand (1998) .... Jake Brown
 Homicide: The Movie (2000, TV Movie) .... Eric Thomas James
 Othello (2001, TV Movie) .... John Othello
 Whitewash: The Clarence Bradley Story (2002, TV Movie) .... Jew Don Boney
 The Jury (2004) .... Ted Truziak
 Rose and Maloney (2004) .... George Parris
 ER (2006) .... Dr. Stephen Dakarai
 Justice (2006-2007) .... Luther Graves
 Bonekickers (2008) .... Senator Joy
 Moses Jones (2009) .... Solomon
 Kings (2009) .... Reverend Ephram Samuels
 The Whole Truth (2010)
 Lights Out (2011) .... Ed Romeo
 Chicago Fire (2012-present) .... Wallace Boden
 Strike Back (2012) .... Walter Lutulu
 George Gently (2012) .... Ambrose Kenny
 Copper (2013) .... Frederick Douglass
 Chicago P.D. (2014-Present) .... Wallace Boden
 Chicago Med (2017-Present) .... Wallace Boden

Audio book
 World War Z (2006)- Paul Redeker

Theatre
 Julius Caesar (2005)
 Othello (2007)

Interviews
 The Bill Podcast: Eamonn Walker Part 1 (2018)

References

External links
 
 Interview with Eamonn Walker in Venice Magazine

1962 births
Living people
English male film actors
English male television actors
English male stage actors
English people of Grenadian descent
English people of Trinidad and Tobago descent
English expatriates in the United States
People from the London Borough of Islington
Male actors from London
Black British male actors
Alumni of the University of North London
New York Film Academy alumni
British expatriate male actors in the United States
20th-century English male actors
21st-century English male actors